Richard Crawford White (April 29, 1923February 18, 1998) was an American lawyer, World War II veteran, and Democratic politician from El Paso, Texas, who served in the Texas House of Representatives from 1955 to 1959 and in the U.S. House of Representatives from 1965 to 1983.

Early life and career
Born in El Paso, Texas, White graduated from Dudley Primary School, El Paso High School, and the Citizens' Military Training Camp at San Antonio, Texas. Subsequently, from 1940 to 1942, he attended the University of Texas at El Paso, then known as Texas Western College.

World War II
After his second year of college, White began his World War II service from 1942 to 1945 in the United States Marine Corps as a rifleman and Japanese-English interpreter in the Pacific Theater.  As a result of injuries suffered, he was awarded the Purple Heart.

Legal career
Returning to Texas after the war, White received his bachelor's degree in 1946 from the University of Texas at Austin and his J.D. in 1949 from the University of Texas School of Law.  He was admitted to the Texas state bar in 1949 and returned to El Paso to begin his legal career. He served two-year terms in the Texas House of Representatives, having been elected in 1954 and 1956. He was the El Paso County Democratic chairman from 1963 to 1965.

Tenure
He was elected to the historic Eighty-ninth Congress as part of the national 1964 Democratic surge linked to U.S. President Lyndon B. Johnson's crushing defeat of Republican U.S. Senator Barry M. Goldwater of Arizona. White played his part by unseating freshman Republican Ed Foreman of Odessa in the 16th Congressional District. He actually received more votes than Johnson did in the 16th District.

During his first term, White represented a monstrous district stretching from El Paso all the way to the Permian Basin—an area of over 42,000 square miles.  However, after Texas' congressional map was thrown out in Wesberry v. Sanders, his district was cut down to El Paso and a few inner-ring suburbs.  He was reelected eight times from this district with almost no difficulty.

As a U.S. representative, White developed a reputation as a moderate Democrat. White voted in favor the Voting Rights Act of 1965 and the Civil Rights Act of 1968. He also chaired the Democratic Research Organization, a group within the party that distributed information from the leadership relevant to pending votes.  Having Fort Bliss in the 16th Congressional District made White a natural choice for his place on the House Armed Services Committee. There he chaired the Military Personnel Subcommittee  and was also instrumental in reorganization of the Joint Chiefs of Staff. He also served for a while on the Interior, Post Office & Civil Service, and Science & Technology committees. White was described as a 'cautious conservative'. Choosing not to run again in 1982, White returned to his hometown of El Paso to resume his law practice.

Personal life
White was married twice. His first marriage in 1949 to Katherine Huffman produced three sons, Rodrick, Richard, and Raymond.  After her death in 1972, White married the former Kathleen Fitzgerald in 1973. The second marriage produced one daughter, Bonnie, two sons, Sean and Brian, and one step-son, Kenneth.

White died on February 18, 1998.  He was interred at Arlington National Cemetery, in Arlington, Virginia, in area 7A.

References

External links

 

1923 births
1998 deaths
Politicians from El Paso, Texas
University of Texas at El Paso alumni
University of Texas School of Law alumni
Texas lawyers
Democratic Party members of the Texas House of Representatives
United States Marine Corps personnel of World War II
United States Marines
Burials at Arlington National Cemetery
Democratic Party members of the United States House of Representatives from Texas
20th-century American politicians
20th-century American lawyers